Chuadanga is a prosperous city in the western part of Bangladesh. It is the headquarters of Chuadanga Sadar Upazila and Chuadanga District. Chuadanga was the first capital of Bangladesh. It was the sub-district of Kushtia district & turned into a district in 1984. In 1862, the first railway station in Bangladesh was established in Chuadanga city. Chuadanga city is connected by rail and road across the country.

Education
Victoria Jubilee Government High School, founded in 1880, and Chuadanga Government Girls' High School (1914) are notable secondary schools in Chuadanga. Chuadanga Govt. College is also notable higher educational institute in the district. Which was founded in 1962.

References

External links

Cities in Bangladesh
Populated places in Khulna Division